The 2010 No Surrender was a professional wrestling pay-per-view event produced by Total Nonstop Action Wrestling (TNA), which took place on September 5, 2010 at the Impact Zone in Orlando, Florida. It was the sixth event under the No Surrender chronology and the ninth event of the 2010 TNA pay-per-view schedule.

In October 2017, with the launch of the Global Wrestling Network, the event became available to stream on demand.

Storylines

No Surrender featured eight professional wrestling matches that involved different wrestlers from pre-existing scripted feuds and storylines. Wrestlers portrayed villains, heroes, or less distinguishable characters in the scripted events that built tension and culminated in a wrestling match or series of matches.

Results

See also
2010 in professional wrestling

References

External links
Official website
TNA Wrestling.com

Impact Wrestling No Surrender
2010 in professional wrestling in Florida
Events in Orlando, Florida
Professional wrestling in Orlando, Florida
September 2010 events in the United States
2010 Total Nonstop Action Wrestling pay-per-view events